State Highway 72 (SH‑72) is a  state highway in Payette County, Idaho, United States, that connects U.S. Route 30 (US 30), south of new Plymouth, with Idaho State Highway 52 (SH‑52) in Hamilton Corner. SH‑72 is maintained by the Idaho Transportation Department.

Route description
(US 30 heads north toward New Plymouth, Fruitland, and Payette and south to run concurrent with Interstate 84 [I‑84] and on toward Caldwell and Boise.)

After an intersection with Blaine Road, the highway continues east toward the unincorporated community of Hamilton Corner.

In Hamilton Corner, SH‑72 reaches it eastern terminus at an intersection with SH‑52 and Sand Hollow Road. (Eastbound SH‑52 continues east toward Emmett and Horseshoe Bend. Westbound SH‑52 heads north toward Payette and Weiser. Sand Hollow Road [Old Highway 30] heads south toward I‑84, Sand Hollow, and Caldwell.)

History
The entire length of SH‑72 was formerly designated as US 30, while US 30 south from the western terminus of SH‑72 to I‑84 was formerly Idaho State Highway 73. Sand Hollow Road (Old Highway 30) south from Hamilton Corner was formerly designated as US 30 before US 30 was substantially re-routed in the area.

Future

SH‑ was closed through October 2017 for a bridge replacement and improvements to its junction with US 30 one mile south of New Plymouth. The roadway was scheduled to reopen in November 2017.

Major intersections

See also

 List of state highways in Idaho

References

External links

072
Transportation in Payette County, Idaho